Bazarak is the capital city of Panjshir Province, Afghanistan.

Bazarak may also refer to:

Bazarak, Balkh, Afghanistan
Bazarak District, a district of Panjshir Province in northeastern Afghanistan. The administrative centre is the city of Bazarak